I Promise I Will Never Stop Going In is a mixtape by American hip hop recording artist Rich Homie Quan; released on November 26, 2013, by T.I.G. Entertainment.

Singles
"Walk Thru" was released on February 4, 2014, as the first single. The song features guest vocals from fellow rapper Problem, who also produced this track, alongside Dupri.

"Blah Blah Blah" was released on September 30, 2014, as the second single. It was produced by Izze The Producer.

Track listing
All songs written by Dequantes Lamar

Charts

References

2013 mixtape albums
Albums produced by Metro Boomin
Albums produced by London on da Track
Albums produced by FKi (production team)